"El Makinon" (Spanish for "The Big Machine") is a song by Colombian singer-songwriter Karol G and American singer Mariah Angeliq. It was written by Karol G, Mariah Angeliq, Gabriel Mora, Freddy Montalvo and Jose Cruz, and produced by Neo. The song was released on March 25, 2021 through Universal Music Latino, as the fifth single from her third studio album KG0516.

Background 
The song was first revealed through Karol G’s album track list announcement for her third studio album KG0516 on March 22, 2021. The song was released on March 25, 2021 with the release of the album.

Critical reception 

Billboard stated: "Infectious head-bopping, hip-swaying reggaetón jam about breaking all the rules with the girls. A risqué scene towards the end proves, once again, that the new Karol is unapologetic."

Commercial performance 

The song debuted at number 9 on the Billboard Hot Latin Songs chart dated April 10, 2021. It peaked at number 6 on the chart dated May 1, 2021. It failed to enter the Billboard Hot 100 chart but entered and peaked at number 4 on the US Bubbling Under Hot 100 chart dated June 5, 2021. The song received a Latin diamond certification by the Recording Industry Association of America (RIAA) on November 24, 2021, for sales of 600,000 equivalent-units.

Awards and nominations

Music video 
The music video for "El Makinon" was directed by Jose-Emilio Sagaró, filmed in The Bronx, NY, USA, and was released on Karol G’s YouTube channel on March 25, 2021. The arresting officer role is played by American actor Simonas Zmuidzinas. As of February 2023, it has over 896 million views and 4.5 million likes.

Charts

Certifications

Release history

References 

Karol G songs
2021 singles
2021 songs
Spanish-language songs
Songs written by Karol G